El Idrissia is a town and commune in Djelfa Province, Algeria. According to the 2008 census it has a population of 29,856. It used to be known as Zenina, named after a wealthy woman who was married to a Roman officer called Serdoun. This name was given to the nearby mountain.

References

Communes of Djelfa Province
Djelfa Province